Villa is an island in the municipality of Flatanger in Trøndelag county, Norway. The Villa Lighthouse is located on the western part of the island. The island had some permanent residents until the 1960s, but now it is uninhabited.

Large parts of the island consists of rocky mountains and rocks, but it also has bogs and heather areas and offers a rich flora, with some rare plants such as the yellow water-lily.

See also
List of islands of Norway

References

Islands of Trøndelag
Flatanger